Gianni Versace S.r.l., usually referred to as Versace, is an Italian luxury fashion company founded by Gianni Versace in 1978 known for flashy prints and bright colors. The company produces Italian-made ready-to-wear and accessories, as well as haute couture under its Atelier Versace brand and licenses its name and branding to Luxottica for eyewear. Gianni Versace being a native of Calabria, in the ancient Magna Grecia (Greater Greece), the company logo is inspired by Medusa, a figure from Greek mythology.

History and operations

In 1972, Gianni Versace designed his first collections for Callaghan, Genny, and Complice. In 1978, the company launched under the name "Gianni Versace Donna” and opened its first boutique in Milan's Via della Spiga. Gianni independently controlled much of the brand, from designing to retailing. In 1982, the company expanded its offerings to include accessories, jewelry, home furnishings, and china. In 1993, Donatella Versace added the Young Versace and Versus lines. In 1994, the brand gained international coverage from the black Versace dress of Elizabeth Hurley, referred in the media as "that dress".

Versace has designed for various music artists, including stage and album cover costumes for Elton John in 1992 and outfits for Michael Jackson. Versace also designed clothing for the Princess of Wales and Princess Caroline of Monaco.

After the murder of Gianni Versace in 1997, his sister Donatella, formerly vice-president, took over as creative director, and his older brother Santo Versace became CEO. Donatella's daughter Allegra Versace was left a 50 percent stake in the company, which she assumed control of on her eighteenth birthday.

In 2000, the green Versace dress worn by Jennifer Lopez at the Grammy Awards gained extensive media attention. The dress was voted the fifth most iconic dress of all time and Elizabeth Hurley's black Versace dress was voted most iconic dress of all time, according to a 2008 Daily Telegraph poll.

With the company's profits in decline in the early 2000s, Fabio Massimo Cacciatori was hired as interim CEO to reorganise and restructure Versace Group in 2003. Cacciatori resigned in December 2003 due to "disputes with the Versace family". In 2004, Giancarlo di Risio from IT Holding became CEO, until he resigned in 2009 due to disagreements with Donatella. In May 2016, the Versace Group appointed Jonathan Akeroyd as CEO and board member.

, more than 1500 boutiques operate worldwide; the first boutique outside of Italy opened in Glasgow, Scotland, in 1991.

In September 2018, Michael Kors offered to buy Versace for two billion euros. Versace announced all Blackstone and Versace family shares were sold to Michael Kors Limited. The acquisition was completed in December 2018, with Donatella Versace remaining head of creative design. In January 2019, Gianni Versace S.r.l. joined Capri Holdings Limited, forming a new global fashion luxury group alongside Michael Kors and Jimmy Choo.

In 2018, Versace stopped using fur in its products and in 2020 announced it would stop using kangaroo leather. In October 2018, Versace announced its first Pre-Fall season show in New York, scheduled on Gianni Versace's December 2 birth date. In 2021, Versace opened its first SoHo, New York boutique.

Collaborations 
 In 2006, Gianni Versace S.r.l. collaborated with Lamborghini to produce the Lamborghini Murciélago LP640 Versace. The car included a Versace-designed white satin interior with Versace's logo embroidered into the seats. The car was available in black or white and came with a luggage set, driving shoes, and driving gloves. Only ten units were produced.

 In 2008, Versace collaborated with AgustaWestland to create the AgustaWestland AW109 Grand Versace VIP luxury helicopter, including a Versace leather interior and Versace-designed exterior.
 In 2009, Versace and H&M released a new line for H&M's stores, including men's and women's clothing and home items, such as pillows and blankets.
 In 2015, Versace collaborated with dancer Lil Buck to release a line of sneakers.
 In 2015, Versace partnered with Mind Group. The companies designed luxury residential towers in China called the Versace Residencies. The goal of the creators was to combine Versace's luxury home elements with elements of traditional Chinese culture. 
 Also in 2015, Versace partnered with the ABIL Group in India to develop another luxury residential project, located in South Mumbai.
 In 2015, Donatella Versace was featured in Riccardo Tisci's Givenchy campaign.
 In 2018, Ronnie Fieg and Donatella Versace debuted their Kith x Versace collection, featuring a modified medusa logo with "KITH" written over its eyes.
 In 2019, Versace collaborated with Turkish Airlines to provide amenity kits to business class passengers on long-haul flights. The kits came in separately styled bags for men and women and featured the Versace Eros line of products for men and Versace Eros pour Femme products for women. 
 Versace Men's Fall 2019 collection featured several items with the logo of Ford Motor Company. According to the fashion house, the two companies joined forces to channel "the excitement of buying your first car."
 In September 2021, Versace presented a joint fashion show with Fendi, titled "The Swap", consisting of two collections: Fendi's vision for Versace and Versace's vision for Fendi. This marked the first time two artistic directors of brands in different fashion groups designed collections for each other.
 In 2021, Versace collaborated with Lady Gaga to celebrate Born This Way's tenth anniversary by creating a capsule collection with proceeds benefiting the Born This Way Foundation.

Palazzo Versace
Soheil Abedian, of Sunland Group, approached Versace in 1997 proposing a luxury hotel built for the Versace brand. The first Palazzo Versace opened on Australia's Gold Coast on 15 September 2000. The hotel was sold to a Chinese consortium in December 2012. The second Palazzo, the Palazzo Versace Dubai, was completed in December 2015 and is located on the foreshore of Dubai Creek. A third Palazzo, the Palazzo Versace Macau, is under construction as part of a  partnership with Macau's largest casino operator SJM Holdings. The Palazzo Versace hotels are the world's first fashion-branded hotels.

Controversy
In August 2019, Versace produced a range of tops suggesting Hong Kong and Macau were separate countries. Versace apologized, saying it made a mistake in the design and would destroy the offending clothing. In response to the controversy, Yang Mi ended her relationship as brand ambassador for Versace.

Notes

References

External links 
 

 
Italian suit makers
Clothing brands of Italy
Eyewear brands of Italy
Companies based in Milan
Haute couture
High fashion brands
Jewellery retailers of Italy
Luxury brands
Shoe companies of Italy
Watch manufacturing companies of Italy
2018 mergers and acquisitions
Italian companies established in 1978
Altagamma members

az:Gianni Versace